Ailill Corrach mac Flainn (died 741) was a king of the Uí Failge, a Laigin people of County Offaly. He was one of the many sons of Fland Dá Chongal, a previous king. He ruled from 714 to 741. The byname Corrach means unsteady.

Four of his brothers were slain at the Battle of Áth Senaig in 738 when the men of Leinster were crushed by the high king Áed Allán. Ailill was killed in 741 but the circumstances are not given.

Notes

See also
 Kings of Ui Failghe

References

 Byrne, Francis John (2001), Irish Kings and High-Kings, Dublin: Four Courts Press, 
 Mac Niocaill, Gearoid (1972), Ireland before the Vikings, Dublin: Gill and Macmillan

External links
CELT: Corpus of Electronic Texts at University College Cork

741 deaths
People from County Offaly
8th-century Irish monarchs
Year of birth unknown